The UCI Track Cycling World Championships are the set of world championship events for the various disciplines and distances in track cycling. They are regulated by the Union Cycliste Internationale. Before 1900, they were administered by the UCI's predecessor, the International Cycling Association (ICA).

Current events include: time trial, keirin, individual pursuit, team pursuit, points race, scratch race, sprint, team sprint, omnium and madison. Women's events are generally shorter than men's. Events which are no longer held include the motor paced events and tandem events.

History
World championships were first held in 1893, in Chicago, under the ICA. They were for amateurs. Separate professional races were held from 1895, in Cologne. Amateurs and professionals competed in separate events until 1993, after which they raced together in "open" races. Championships are open to riders selected by their national cycling association. They compete in the colours of their country.

The winner of ICA championships received a gold medal. The UCI awards a gold medal and a rainbow jersey to the winner. Silver and bronze medals are awarded to the second and third place contestants. World champions wear their rainbow jersey until the following year's championship, but they may wear it only in the type of event in which they won it. Former champions can wear rainbow cuffs to their everyday jerseys.

World track championships are allocated to different countries each year. They are run by that country's national cycling association, although the top referees (President of the Commissaire's panel – PCP, Secretary, Starter, and Judge Referee) are International Commissaires appointed by the UCI.

Hosts

Championships

All-time medal table
Updated after the 2022 World Championships.

Most successful athletesUpdated after the 2022 World Championships.

Results by country

  Argentina
  Australia
  Austria
  Belarus
  Belgium
  Brazil
  Canada
  Chile
  Chinese Taipei
  Cuba
  Denmark
  Finland
  France
  Greece
  Hong Kong
  Ireland
  Italy
  Japan
  Kazakhstan
  Lithuania
  Malaysia
  Mexico
  Netherlands
  New Zealand
  Poland
  Russia
  Slovakia
  South Africa
  South Korea
  Spain
  Suriname
  Switzerland
  Trinidad and Tobago
  Ukraine
  United States
  Uzbekistan
  Venezuela

Results by event

 UCI Track Cycling World Championships – Men's 1 km time trial
 UCI Track Cycling World Championships – Men's individual pursuit
 UCI Track Cycling World Championships – Men's keirin
 UCI Track Cycling World Championships – Men's madison
 UCI Track Cycling World Championships – Men's omnium
 UCI Track Cycling World Championships – Men's points race
 UCI Track Cycling World Championships – Men's scratch
 UCI Track Cycling World Championships – Men's sprint
 UCI Track Cycling World Championships – Men's team pursuit
 UCI Track Cycling World Championships – Men's team sprint
 UCI Track Cycling World Championships – Men's tandem (defunct)
 UCI Track Cycling World Championships – Women's 500 m time trial
 UCI Track Cycling World Championships – Women's individual pursuit
 UCI Track Cycling World Championships – Women's keirin
 UCI Track Cycling World Championships – Women's madison
 UCI Track Cycling World Championships – Women's omnium
 UCI Track Cycling World Championships – Women's points race
 UCI Track Cycling World Championships – Women's scratch
 UCI Track Cycling World Championships – Women's sprint
 UCI Track Cycling World Championships – Women's team pursuit
 UCI Track Cycling World Championships – Women's team sprint
 UCI Motor-paced World Championships (defunct)

See also

 UCI Track Cycling World Ranking
 UCI Track Cycling World Cup Classics
 UCI Junior Track Cycling World Championships
 UCI Para-cycling Track World Championships

References

 
Track
Track cycling races
Recurring sporting events established in 1893